Nesah Kuh, also rendered as Nesa Kuh, may refer to:
 Nesah Kuh Ali Chin
 Nesa Kuh-e Bard
 Nesah Kuh Veysi Chin